Vitisin B may refer to:
 Vitisin B (pyranoanthocyanin)
 Vitisin B (stilbenoid)

See also
 Vitisin